Emily Hartong  (born February 4, 1992) is an American female volleyball player. With her club Voléro Zürich she competed at the 2015 FIVB Volleyball Women's Club World Championship.

In 2015–16, she became a member of Hyundai-Hillstate volleyball club, and her team won the Korean Volleyball Pro League Championship.  She won the league's Best Outside Hitter award, as she ranked 5th best scorer and 5th best defensive player of the league.

She and her team agreed to extend the contract, as she earned herself fame of "best foreign player of the year".

References

External links
As A Wahine:
http://www.hawaiiathletics.com/roster.aspx?rp_id=12415
http://khon2.com/2014/06/13/former-uh-star-emily-hartong-signs-with-volero-zurich/

1992 births
Living people
American women's volleyball players
Place of birth missing (living people)
Hawaii Rainbow Wahine volleyball players
Outside hitters
Expatriate volleyball players in Switzerland
Expatriate volleyball players in South Korea
American expatriate sportspeople in Switzerland
American expatriate sportspeople in South Korea
People from Los Alamitos, California
Sportspeople from Orange County, California